Alexander Thomas Thomson (born 30 October 1993) is an English cricketer. He made his debut for Warwickshire in the 2017 County Championship on 19 September 2017. He made his List A debut for Warwickshire against the West Indies A team in a tri-series warm-up match on 17 June 2018. He made his Twenty20 debut for Warwickshire in the 2018 t20 Blast on 10 August 2018.

References

External links
 
 Alex Thomson at Warwickshire County Cricket Club

1993 births
Living people
Alumni of Cardiff Metropolitan University
English cricketers
Cardiff MCCU cricketers
Warwickshire cricketers
Cricketers from Stoke-on-Trent
Staffordshire cricketers
Marylebone Cricket Club cricketers
Durham cricketers
Derbyshire cricketers